"Move That Body" is a song by American hip hop artist Nelly. The song features T-Pain and Akon, and was produced by Bangladesh with Dr. Luke. It was released on October 12, 2010, and served as the second single from Nelly's sixth studio album, 5.0. The song received negative reviews from various hip hop critics and fans based upon lack of production and use of auto-tune.

Music video
A music video was shot on October 6, 2010. The video premiered on October 19 on VEVO. In the "sizzling" clip, Nelly goes to an underground fight-style dance club, meeting up with Akon and T-Pain who make bets with fellow rappers T.I., Yo Gotti, producers Bangladesh and Jermaine Dupri on the sidelines, as various ladies are seen dancing. The video was directed by Marc Klasfeld.

Chart performance
"Move That Body" became a major disappointment on the charts by debuting at number 54 on the Billboard Hot 100 and falling off the chart the week after. The same reception happened to the single on the ARIA charts when it debuted at number 29 and also fell off the week after.

Charts

Release history

References

External links

2010 singles
2010 songs
Nelly songs
Songs written by Nelly
T-Pain songs
Songs written by T-Pain
Akon songs
Songs written by Akon
Song recordings produced by Bangladesh (record producer)
Songs written by Bangladesh (record producer)
Song recordings produced by Dr. Luke
Music videos directed by Marc Klasfeld
Universal Motown Records singles